Araeosoma parviungulatum is a species of sea urchin of the family Echinothuriidae. Their armour is covered with spines. It is placed in the genus Araeosoma and lives in the sea. Araeosoma parviungulatum was first scientifically described in 1934 by Ole Theodor Jensen Mortensen.

See also 
 Araeosoma leptaleum
 Araeosoma owstoni
 Araeosoma paucispinum

References 

parviungulatum
Animals described in 1934
Taxa named by Ole Theodor Jensen Mortensen